This is a list of hotels in the United States, both current and defunct, organized by state. The list includes highly rated luxury hotels, skyscraper rated buildings, and historic hotels. It is not a directory of every chain or independent hotel building in the United States.

Alabama

Exchange Hotel, Montgomery
Russel Erskine Hotel
Victoryland

Mobile

The Battle House Hotel
Renaissance Riverview Plaza Hotel

Birmingham

Redmont Hotel
Russel Erskine Hotel
Thomas Jefferson Hotel

Alaska

Alaskan Hotel and Bar
Bergmann Hotel
Millennium Alaskan Hotel
Van Gilder Hotel

Arizona

6th Avenue Hotel-Windsor Hotel
Arizona Biltmore Hotel
Bowman Hotel
Buena Vista Hotel
Camelback Inn
CityNorth
CityScape (Phoenix)
Cochise Hotel
Copper Queen Hotel
El Tovar Hotel
Francisco Grande
Grand Canyon Lodge
Harrah's Ak-Chin Casino
Hermosa Inn
Hotel Congress
Hotel San Carlos
Hotel Valley Ho
Hyatt Regency Phoenix
La Posada Hotel
Mondrian Hotel
Ox Bow Inn
Phoenix City Square
Phoenix Plaza
Pioneer Hotel
Professional Building
Sheraton Phoenix Downtown
Trump International Hotel & Residence
Weatherford Hotel
Westward Ho
Wigwam Motel

Arkansas

Albert Pike Residence Hotel
Anthony House
Arlington Hotel
Bacon Hotel
Commercial Hotel
Crescent Hotel
Dairy Hollow House
Rusher Hotel
Tall Pines Motor Inn

California

Ahwahnee Hotel
Angels Hotel
Apple Valley Inn
Arlington Hotel, Santa Barbara
Aztec Hotel
Balboa Bay Club & Resort
Balboa Inn
Beverly Wilshire Hotel
Cal Neva Lodge & Casino
Carlton Hotel
Carter House Inn
Casa del Desierto
Casa del Mar hotel
Cecil Hotel
Claremont Resort
Cloyne Court Hotel
Colony Palms Hotel
Culver Hotel
Cypress Inn
De Anza Hotel
Deetjen's Big Sur Inn
Disneyland Hotel
Disney's Grand Californian Hotel & Spa
Disney's Paradise Pier Hotel
Drakesbad Guest Ranch
Ducey's Bass Lake Lodge
Dunbar Hotel
East Brother Island Light
El Garces Hotel
El Carmelo Hotel
Eureka Inn
Fairmont San Jose
Glen Tavern Inn
Green Shutter Hotel
The Hacienda, Milpitas
Hayes Mansion
Hilton Anaheim
Hilton San Diego Bayfront
Hilton Waterfront Beach Resort
Holbrooke Hotel
Hollywood Melrose Hotel
Hollywood Plaza Hotel
Hoover Hotel
Horton Grand Hotel
Hotel Arcata
Hotel Chancellor
Hotel Charlotte, Groveland
Hotel del Coronado
Hotel Green
Hotel Léger
Hotel Mac
Hotel Montgomery
Hotel Sainte Claire
Hotel Woodland
The Keating Hotel
Key Route Inn
La Costa Resort and Spa
La Quinta Resort and Club
La Playa Hotel
Los Laureles Lodge
 L’Auberge Carmel
Lafayette Hotel & Suites in San Diego
The Langham Huntington, Pasadena
Madonna Inn
Manchester Grand Hyatt Hotel
Motel Inn of San Luis Obispo
Murphys Hotel
National Exchange Hotel
New Hotel Carquinez
Padre Hotel
Park Hyatt Resort Aviara
Piedras Blancas Motel
Pierpont Inn
Pine Inn
Raymond Hotel
Ritz-Carlton Half Moon Bay
Robinson Hotel
Roy's Motel and Café
San Diego Marriott Hotel and Marina
San Gorgonio Inn
Santa Barbara Biltmore
Shutters on the Beach Hotel
Southern Hotel, Perris
Sovereign Hotel
Stagecoach Inn
Sunset Tower
Superior Oil Company Building
Sycamore Mineral Springs Resort
Mission Inn
The Lodge at Pebble Beach
Thunder Valley Casino Resort
U.S. Grant Hotel
Venetian Court
Wagon Wheel
Wawona Hotel
The Westin San Diego
Wigwam Motel
Yosemite Lodge at the Falls

Los Angeles County

Alan Hotel, established 1942, demolished 1986
Ambassador Hotel, opened 1921, demolished 2005
Andaz West Hollywood, opened 1963 as the Gene Autry
Aztec Hotel, existing
Bella Union Hotel, constructed 1835, demolished 1940
Beverly Hills Hotel, opened 1912
Beverly Hilton Hotel, opened 1953
Beverly Wilshire Hotel, completed 1928
Boyle Hotel – Cummings Block, existing
Century Plaza Hotel, opened 1966
Chateau Marmont, built 1927
Culver Hotel, built 1924
Downtown Standard Hotel, completed 1956, reopened as hotel 2002
Dunbar Hotel, opened 1928 as the Dunbar, now an apartment building
Fremont Hotel, opened 1902, demolished 1955
Halifax Hotel, demolished
Hilton Santa Monica Hotel & Suites
Hollywood Hotel, razed 1956
Hollywood Melrose Hotel, built 1927
Hotel Bel-Air, opened 1946
Hotel Chancellor, built 1924, now an apartment building
Knickerbocker Hotel, built 1925, now an apartment building
Kyoto Grand Hotel and Gardens, opened 1977 as the New Otani
Millennium Biltmore Hotel, opened 1923
Mondrian Hotel, built 1959
Monte Vista Hotel, built 1887, demolished 1964
Park Plaza Hotel, built 1920s
The Peninsula Beverly Hills
Pico House, built 1869–70, exists as historic landmark
Raffles L'Ermitage, built 1970s
Roosevelt Hotel, opened 1927
Sheraton Town House/Sheraton West, opened 1929
Sportsmen's Lodge, operating since the 1880s
Standard Hotel, opened 1999
Sunset Marquis Hotel, existing
Sunset Tower, opened 1931
Superior Oil Company Building, completed 1956
The Town House, built 1929
Vibe Hotel, built 1952
Westin Bonaventure Hotel, constructed 1974–76

San Francisco

Ambassador Hotel
Clift
Fairmont San Francisco
Four Seasons Hotel, San Francisco
Grand Hyatt San Francisco
Hilton San Francisco Union Square
Hotel des Arts
Hotel Majestic
Hotel Union Square
Hugo Hotel
Huntington Hotel
Hyatt Regency San Francisco
I-Hotel
InterContinental San Francisco
JW Marriott San Francisco Union Square
Le Méridien San Francisco
Mandarin Oriental, San Francisco
Mark Hopkins Hotel
Palace Hotel
Palace Hotel Residential Tower
Park Central Hotel San Francisco
Queen Anne Hotel
The Red Victorian
San Francisco Marriott Marquis
Stanford Court Hotel
W San Francisco
Westin St. Francis

Colorado

Antlers Hilton Hotel
Astor House
Beaumont Hotel
The Broadmoor  
Glenisle
Grand Lake Lodge
Hotel Boulderado
Hotel Colorado
Hotel Jerome
Kauffman House
Pacific Hotel
Redstone Inn
St. Elmo Hotel
The Stanley Hotel
Teller House	
Victor Hotel
Western Hotel
Winks Panorama

Denver

Brown Palace Hotel
Courtyard Denver Downtown
The Curtis
Denver Marriott City Center
Four Seasons Hotel Denver
Hyatt Regency Denver at the Colorado Convention Center
Regency Hotel
Ritz-Carlton Denver

Connecticut

Dorrance Inn
Elton Hotel
Foxwoods Resort Casino
The Griswold Inn
Hampton Inn
Hotel Bond
Lighthouse Inn
Mohegan Sun
Winvian

Delaware

Deer Park Tavern
Dover Downs
DuPont Building
Robinson House

Florida

Arcade Hotel
Belleview-Biltmore Hotel
Boca Raton Resort
Carling Hotel
Casa Marina Hotel
Casa Monica Hotel
Chalet Suzanne
Coral Gables Biltmore Hotel
Dixie Walesbilt Hotel
Don CeSar
Fort Harrison Hotel
Henry B. Plant Museum
Hotel George Washington
Hyatt Regency Jacksonville
Kenilworth Lodge
Ormond Hotel
Plaza Hotel
Polk Hotel
Ponce De Leon Boutique Hotel
Ponce de Leon Hotel
Ponte Vedra Inn and Club
Ritz Plaza Hotel
Royal Poinciana Hotel
Streamline Hotel
Vinoy Park Hotel
Well'sbuilt Hotel
World Golf Village

Miami and Miami Beach

Cadillac Hotel
Capital at Brickell
Clinton Hotel Miami Beach
The Creek South Beach
Delano Hotel
Doral Hotel
DuPont Plaza Hotel
Eden Roc Renaissance Hotel Miami Beach
EPIC Miami Residences and Hotel
Espirito Santo Plaza
Flamingo Hotel, Miami Beach
Fontainebleau Miami Beach
Four Seasons Hotel Miami
The Grand Doubletree
Icon Brickell
Mandarin Oriental, Miami
Marquis Residences
Met 2 Marriott Marquis
Miccosukee Resort and Gaming
Mondrian Hotel
The Mutiny Hotel
Ocean Spray Hotel
Ritz Plaza Hotel
Saxony Hotel
The Surfcomber Hotel
W Miami Hotel

Orlando

Court of Flags Resort
Marriott's Grande Vista
Marriott's Orlando World Center
Holiday Inn Resort Orlando Suites – Waterpark (Formerly Nickelodeon Suites Resort)
Parliament House
The Peabody Orlando
Seminole Hotel
Seralago Hotel & Suites Main Gate East
Well'sbuilt Hotel

Walt Disney World area

Bay Lake Tower
Best Western Lake Buena Vista Resort Hotel
Buena Vista Palace Resort & Spa
Disney's All-Star Movies Resort
Disney's All-Star Music Resort
Disney's All-Star Sports Resort
Disney's Animal Kingdom Lodge
Disney's Art of Animation Resort
Disney's Beach Club Resort
Disney's BoardWalk Resort
Disney's Caribbean Beach Resort
Disney's Contemporary Resort
Disney's Coronado Springs Resort
Disney's Grand Floridian Resort & Spa
Disney's Old Key West Resort
Disney's Polynesian Resort
Disney's Pop Century Resort
Disney's Port Orleans Resort
Disney's Riviera Resort
Disney's Wilderness Lodge
Disney's Yacht Club Resort
Hilton Walt Disney World
Holiday Inn in the Walt Disney World Resort
Royal Plaza Hotel
Shades of Green
Walt Disney World Dolphin
Walt Disney World Swan
Wyndham Lake Buena Vista

Georgia

Jekyll Island Club
King and Prince Hotel
Lithia Springs Hotel
Windsor Hotel
Mansion on Forsyth Park

Atlanta

Atlanta Biltmore Hotel and Biltmore Apartments
Atlanta Marriott Marquis
Four Seasons Hotel Atlanta
Georgian Terrace Hotel
Henry Grady Hotel
Hyatt Regency Atlanta
Kimball House
The Mansion on Peachtree
Markham House
Rhodes-Haverty Building
TWELVE Midtown
Washington Hall
Westin Peachtree Plaza Hotel
Winecoff Hotel
Clermont Hotel

Hawaii

'Alohilani Resort Waikiki Beach
Ala Moana Hotel
Alexander Young Building
Aulani
Coco Palms Resort
The Fairmont Orchid
Four Seasons Resort Hualalai
Four Seasons Resort Lanai
Four Seasons Resort Maui
Hale Koa Hotel
Halekulani
Hilton Hawaiian Village
Hilton Waikoloa Village
The Ilikai
Mauna Kea Beach Hotel
Moana Hotel
Royal Hawaiian Hotel
Sheraton Waikiki Hotel
Trump International Hotel and Tower (Honolulu)
Turtle Bay Resort
Volcano House

Idaho

Bengoechea Hotel
Dog Bark Park Inn
Hotel Bovill
Hotel Charbonneau
The Roosevelt Inn
Coeur d'Alene Resort

Illinois

Belvidere Café, Motel, and Gas Station
Central House
Chestnut Mountain
Chick House
Faust Landmark
Fort Armstrong Hotel
Grand Rapids Hotel
Harrah's Joliet
Hilton Springfield
Hotel Kewanee
LeClaire Hotel
Leland Hotel
Mermaid House Hotel
Par-A-Dice Hotel and Casino
Pere Marquette Hotel
Pinehill Inn
Rock River Hotel

Chicago

350 West Mart Center
Allerton Hotel
Aqua
Carbide & Carbon Building
Chicago Beach Hotel
Congress Plaza Hotel
Drake Hotel
Elysian, Chicago
Four Seasons Hotel Chicago
Hilton Chicago
Hotel Florence
Hotel Windermere
Hyatt Regency Chicago
Inn of Chicago
InterContinental Chicago
Kinzie Hotel
La Salle Hotel
Morrison Hotel
The Palmer House Hilton
Park Hyatt Chicago
The Peninsula Chicago
Reliance Building
Renaissance Blackstone Hotel
Ritz-Carlton Chicago (A Four Seasons Hotel)
Shoreland Hotel
Silversmith Hotel
Sisson Hotel
Sofitel Chicago Water Tower
Tokyo Hotel
Trump International Hotel and Tower
Waldorf-Astoria Hotel and Residence Tower
Waterview Tower

Indiana

Blue Chip Casino, Hotel and Spa
French Lick Resort Casino
French Lick Springs Hotel
McCurdy Hotel
Terre Haute House
West Baden Springs Hotel

Indianapolis

Canterbury Hotel
Conrad Indianapolis
Fletcher Trust Building
Hilton Indianapolis
Hyatt Regency Indianapolis
JW Marriott Indianapolis
Marriott Indianapolis
Omni Severin Hotel
Spink Arms Hotel

Iowa

Black Hawk Hotel
Burtis-Kimball House Hotel/Burtis Opera House
Davenport Hotel
Des Moines Marriott Hotel
Elks-Rogers Hotel
German American Heritage Center
Grand Harbor Resort and Waterpark
Heartland Inn
Hotel Blackhawk
Hotel Fort Des Moines
Hotel Iowa
Hotel Julien Dubuque
Hotel Kirkwood
Hotel Mississippi-RKO Orpheum Theater
Hotel Ottumwa
Hotel Randolph
Hotel Roosevelt (Cedar Rapids, Iowa)
Hotel Tallcorn
Lenox Hotel (Lenox, Iowa)
Martin Hotel (Sioux City, Iowa)
Northwestern Hotel
Park House Hotel
Park Inn Hotel
Park Motel
Randolph Hotel
Savery Hotel
Schauder Hotel
Wahkonsa Hotel
Warrior Hotel

Kansas

Chateau Avalon
Cimarron Hotel
Hotel at Old Town
Prairie Band Casino & Resort
Weaver Hotel

Kentucky

21c Museum Hotel
Boone Tavern
Brown Hotel
Castle Post
Doe Run Inn
Galt House
Glyndon Hotel
Hilton Lexington/Downtown
Hyatt Regency Hotel
Keene Springs Hotel
Merchant Tower
Nancy Lincoln Inn
New Sherwood Hotel
Old Talbott Tavern
Phoenix Hotel
Seelbach Hotel
Tyler Hotel
Wigwam Motel

Louisiana
Hilton Capitol Center
L'Auberge Baton Rouge
L'Auberge du Lac Resort
Sam's Town Hotel and Gambling Hall, Shreveport

New Orleans

Chateau Bourbon
Grand Palace Hotel, New Orleans
Harrah's New Orleans
Hilton New Orleans
Hilton New Orleans Riverside
Hotel Maison De Ville
Hotel Monteleone
Hyatt Regency New Orleans
JW Marriott Hotel New Orleans
Le Pavillon Hotel
New Orleans Marriott
Omni Royal Orleans
One Canal Place
Place St. Charles
Pontchartrain Hotel
The Roosevelt New Orleans Hotel
Sheraton New Orleans
St. Charles Hotel, New Orleans
W New Orleans
Windsor Court Hotel

Maine

Bethel Inn Resort
Mira Monte Inn
Nickels-Sortwell House
Seaside Inn
Sebasco Harbor Resort
The Westin Portland Harborview

Maryland

300 East Pratt Street
Baltimore Marriott Waterfront Hotel
Belvedere Hotel
Brooklandville House
Deer Park Hotel
Four Seasons Baltimore and Residences
Gaylord National Resort & Convention Center
George Washington House
Glen Oak Hotel
Half-Way House (Parkton, Maryland)
Historic Inns of Annapolis
Hotel Kernan
Indian Queen Tavern and Black's Store
Inn at Perry Cabin
Inns on the National Road
Lord Baltimore Hotel
The Old Inn
Parkton Hotel
Queen City Hotel
Rocky Gap State Park
Rodgers Tavern
Sheraton Baltimore City Center
Sherwood Manor
Tidewater Inn
Tremont Plaza Hotel
Ulysses, Baltimore
Vue Harbor East
Whitehaven Hotel

Massachusetts

Allen Hotel
The Andover Inn
Aurora Hotel
Bancroft Hotel
Boston Park Plaza
Fresh Pond Hotel
Gilbrae Inn
Grafton Inn
The Grandview
Groton Inn
Haynes Hotel Waters Building
Henking Hotel and Cafe
Hotel Adelaide
Hotel Kempsford
Hotel Manger
Hotel Waverly
Maplewood Hotel
Mariners House
Mary Prentiss Inn
Mayflower Inn on Manomet Point
Murray D. Lincoln Campus Center
New Boston Inn
Pequoig Hotel
Railroad Hotel
Wayside Inn
Weldon Hotel
Worthy Hotel

Michigan

Amway Grand Plaza Hotel
Davenport House
Grand Hotel (Mackinac Island)
Hotel Janzen
Islington Hotel
John Chambers House
JW Marriott Grand Rapids
Kerns Hotel
Koch Hotel
Landmark Inn
Soaring Eagle Casino
Stafford's Bay View Inn
Turtle Creek Casino and Hotel

Detroit

Adoba Hotel Dearborn Detroit
The Dearborn Inn
Detroit Marriott at the Renaissance Center
Fort Shelby Hotel
Greektown Casino Hotel
Hotel St. Regis Detroit
Inn at 97 Winder
Inn at St. John's Plymouth Detroit
The Leland Hotel
MGM Grand Detroit
MotorCity Casino Hotel
Riverwalk Hotel Detroit
Royal Park Hotel Rochester Detroit
Townsend Hotel Birmingham Detroit
Westin Book Cadillac Hotel
Westin Southfield Detroit Hotel

Minnesota

Avalon Music
Burntside Lodge
Calumet Hotel
Cushing Hotel
Grand Hotel
Gunflint Lodge
Historic Anderson House Hotel
Kettle Falls Hotel
Naniboujou Club Lodge
The Palmer House
St. James Hotel
Star Lite Motel
Thayer Hotel
Thunderbird Motel
Water Park of America
West Hotel
Winona Hotel

Mississippi

Bally's Casino Tunica
Beau Rivage
Gold Strike Resort and Casino
Grand Casino Biloxi
Grand Casino Gulfport
Hard Rock Hotel and Casino
Harlow's Casino Resort
Harrah's Casino Tunica
IP Casino Resort & Spa
Island View Casino
Jackson Marriott Downtown
King Edward Hotel
Resorts Casino Tunica
Riverside Hotel
Sam's Town Hotel and Gambling Hall, Tunica
Summers Hotel and Subway Lounge

Missouri

Ameristar Casino Kansas City
Buckingham Hotel
Chase Park Plaza
Elms Hotel
Harrah's St. Louis
Hotel Phillips
Hotel President
Isle of Capri Boonville
Marquette Hotel
Millennium Hotel St. Louis
Monroe Hotel
Muehlebach Hotel
Newbern Hotel
Patee House
Pierce Pennant Motor Hotel
Sheraton Kansas City Hotel at Crown Center
Tan-Tar-A Resort

Montana

Atlantic Hotel
Belmont Hotel
Big Sky Resort
Copper King Mansion
Crowne Plaza Hotel Billings
Florence Hotel
Gallatin Gateway Inn
Glacier Park Company
Glacier Park Lodge
Granite Park Chalet
Izaak Walton Inn
Lake McDonald Lodge
Many Glacier Hotel
The Murray Hotel
Radisson Northern Hotel  	
Rising Sun Auto Camp
Roberts Building
Sacajawea Hotel

Nebraska

Omaha

Aquila Court Building
Blackstone Hotel
Cozzens House Hotel
Douglas House (Omaha)
Flatiron Hotel
Grand Central Hotel
Herndon House
Hotel Fontenelle
Prague Hotel
Redick Tower
St. Nicholas Hotel

Nevada

Boulder Dam Hotel
CasaBlanca Resort
Gold Strike Hotel and Gambling Hall
Goldfield Hotel
Hard Rock Hotel and Casino
Harrah's Lake Tahoe
Harveys Lake Tahoe
Hoover Dam Lodge
Little A'Le'Inn
Longstreet Hotel, Casino, and RV Resort
Mesquite Star Hotel and Casino
Mizpah Hotel
MontBleu
Ormsby House
Stagecoach Hotel & Casino

Las Vegas

Aladdin Hotel & Casino
Aliante Casino and Hotel
Aria Resort & Casino
Arizona Charlie's Boulder
Arizona Charlie's Decatur
Bally's Las Vegas
Bellagio (hotel and casino)
Binion's Gambling Hall and Hotel
Binion's Horseshoe
Boardwalk Hotel and Casino
Boulder Station
Bourbon Street Hotel and Casino
Caesars Palace
California Hotel and Casino
Cannery Casino and Hotel
Casino Royale Hotel & Casino
Castaways hotel and casino
Circa Resort & Casino
Circus Circus Las Vegas
Clarion Hotel and Casino
Continental Hotel and Casino
Cosmopolitan of Las Vegas
The Cromwell Las Vegas
The D Las Vegas 
Delano Las Vegas
Desert Inn
The Drew Las Vegas
Dunes (hotel and casino)
Eastside Cannery Hotel and Casino
El Cortez
El Rancho Casino
El Rancho Vegas
Encore Las Vegas
Excalibur Hotel and Casino
Flamingo Las Vegas
Four Queens
Fremont Hotel and Casino
Gold Coast Hotel and Casino
Gold Spike Hotel and Casino
Golden Gate Hotel and Casino
Golden Nugget Las Vegas
Green Valley Ranch resort and spa
Hacienda
Hard Rock Hotel and Casino 
Harrah's Las Vegas
Hotel San Remo
JW Marriott Las Vegas Resort and Spa
Klondike Hotel & Casino
La Concha Motel
Lady Luck Hotel & Casino
The Landmark Hotel and Casino
Las Vegas Club
Las Vegas Plaza
The Linq
Lucky Club Casino and Hotel
Luxor Las Vegas
M Resort
Main Street Station Hotel and Casino and Brewery
Mandalay Bay Resort and Casino
Mandarin Oriental, Las Vegas
Marina Hotel
MGM Grand Las Vegas
The Mint Las Vegas
The Mirage
Moulin Rouge Hotel
New Frontier Hotel and Casino
New York-New York Hotel & Casino
The Orleans Hotel and Casino
Oyo Hotel & Casino 
Palace Station
The Palazzo
Palms Casino Resort
Paris Las Vegas
Park MGM
Planet Hollywood Resort and Casino
Plaza Hotel & Casino
Railroad Pass Casino
Red Rock Casino, Resort & Spa
The Resort at Summerlin
Resorts World Las Vegas
Rio All Suite Hotel and Casino
Riviera
Sam's Town Hotel and Gambling Hall, Las Vegas
Sands Hotel
Santa Fe Station
The Signature at MGM Grand
Silver Sevens
Silver Slipper
Silverbird Hotel
Silverton Las Vegas 
Sahara Las Vegas 
South Point Hotel, Casino & Spa
The Strat Hotel, Casino & Skypod 
Suncoast Hotel and Casino
Sunset Station
Texas Station
Thunderbird
Treasure Island Hotel and Casino
Tropicana Las Vegas
Trump Hotel Las Vegas
Tuscany Suites and Casino
Vdara
Veer Towers
Vegas World
The Venetian, Las Vegas
The Western
Westgate Las Vegas
Westin Casuarina Las Vegas Hotel, Casino & Spa
Westward Ho Hotel and Casino
Wild Wild West Gambling Hall & Hotel
Wynn Las Vegas

Primm
Buffalo Bill's
Primm Valley Resort
Whiskey Pete's

Reno-Sparks

Atlantis Casino Resort
Boomtown Reno
Circus Circus Reno
Club Cal Neva
Eldorado Reno
Grand Sierra Resort
Harrah's Reno
Nugget Casino Resort
Peppermill Reno
Riverside Hotel
Sands Regency
Siena Reno
Silver Legacy Reno
Whitney Peak Hotel (formerly known as Fitzgeralds Reno and CommRow)

New Hampshire

The Balsams Grand Resort Hotel
Eastern Slope Inn
The Exeter Inn
Mount Washington Hotel
Mountain View House
Rockingham Hotel
Tip-Top House
Wentworth by the Sea

New Jersey

ACH Casino Resort
Bally's Atlantic City
The Borgata
Caesars Atlantic City
Camp Whelen
Caribbean Motel
Claridge Atlantic City
Congress Hall (Cape May hotel)
The Empress Hotel
Engleside Hotel
Forrestal Village
Golden Nugget Atlantic City
Golden Nugget Atlantic City (1980-1987)
Hard Rock Hotel and Casino Atlantic City
Harrah's Atlantic City
Harvey Cedars Hotel
Legends Resort & Country Club
Madison Hotel (Atlantic City)
Marlborough-Blenheim Hotel
Metropolitan Hotel (Asbury Park)
Molly Pitcher Inn
Nassau Inn
Penthouse Boardwalk Hotel and Casino
Pinnacle Atlantic City
Red Maple Farm
Resorts Casino Hotel
Rickshaw Inn
Ritz-Carlton Atlantic City
Robert Treat Center
Sands Atlantic City
Seaview (Absecon)
Shelburne Hotel
Showboat Atlantic City
Traymore Hotel
Tropicana Casino & Resort Atlantic City
Trump Plaza Hotel and Casino
Trump Taj Mahal
Trump World's Fair
Union Hotel
The Water Club
The Wild Wild West Casino

New Mexico

Andaluz Hotel
Aztec Auto Court
El Navajo Hotel
El Rancho Hotel & Motel
Hotel Clovis
Hyatt Regency Albuquerque
Montezuma Castle (hotel)
St. James Hotel
Taos Inn

New York

Long Island

Garden City Hotel
Granada Towers
Gurney's Inn
Halliock Inn
Montauk Manor
Octagon Hotel
Roslyn House
Terry-Ketcham Inn

New York City

Bronx

Concourse Plaza Hotel
Opera House Hotel

Brooklyn

Elephantine Colossus
Half Moon Hotel
Hotel Bossert
Hotel St. George

Manhattan

1717 Broadway
6 Times Square
Affinia Hotels
Algonquin Hotel
Allerton Hotel for Women
Barbizon 63
The Benjamin Royal Sonesta New York
Braddock Hotel
Bradford Hotel
Carlyle Hotel
Cassa Hotel & Residences
Cooper Square Hotel
Crowne Plaza Hotel, Times Square
Fifth Avenue Hotel
Four Seasons Hotel New York
The GEM Hotel
Gilsey Hotel
Gilsey House
Gramercy Park Hotel
Grand Hotel
Grand Hyatt New York
Hotel Carter
Hotel Chelsea
Hotel Elysee
Hotel Gansevoort
Hotel Gerard
Hotel Giraffe
Hotel Lafayette
Hotel Pennsylvania
Hotel Roger Williams
Hotel Theresa
Hotel Wolcott
Hudson Hotel
InterContinental New York Barclay Hotel
The Jane
JW Marriott Essex House
Library Hotel
Lombardy Hotel
Mandarin Oriental, New York
Maritime Hotel
Martha Washington Hotel
McGown's Pass Tavern
The Michelangelo
Milford Plaza Hotel
Millenium Hilton Hotel
Millennium UN Plaza
Morgans Hotel
Mount Vernon Hotel Museum
The New York Helmsley Hotel
New York Hilton Midtown
New York Marriott Marquis
The New York Palace Hotel
New Yorker Hotel
Olcott Hotel
Paramount Hotel
Park Central Hotel
The Peninsula New York
The Pierre
Plaza Hotel
The Ritz-Carlton New York (historically the Hotel St. Moritz)
The Roosevelt Hotel
Row NYC Hotel
Royalton Hotel
St. Regis New York
Seville Hotel
Sheraton New York Hotel and Towers
Sherry Netherland Hotel
Sofitel New York Hotel
Soldiers', Sailors', Marines', Coast Guard and Airmen's Club
St. Nicholas Hotel
Standard Hotel
Sunshine Hotel
Times Square Hotel
Trump International Hotel and Tower
Trump SoHo
W New York Downtown Hotel and Residences
Waldorf-Astoria Hotel
Warwick New York Hotel
Webster Hotel

Queens

 Curley's Atlas Hotel and Baths
 Marine Pavilion
 Ramada Plaza JFK Hotel
 Rockaway Beach Hotel

Upstate New York

Adams-Ryan House
Adirondack Hotel
Adirondak Loj
Adler Hotel
American Hotel
Arlington Hotel
Arthur Tavern
Aurora Inn
Avon Inn
Bagg's Hotel
Bateman Hotel
Bear Mountain Inn
Beaverkill Valley Inn
Belmont Hotel
Blue Mountain House Annex
Brick Tavern Stand
Brookside Museum
C. Burton Hotel
Caledonia House Hotel
Cannon Building
Catskill Mountain House
Chase Mills Inn
Clark-Dearstyne-Miller Inn
Clifton Park Hotel
Clinton House
Cobblestone Inn
Concord Resort Hotel
Cromwell Manor
Delaney Hotel
Drovers Inn and Round Family Residence
Elston Hall
Foster Building
Frontier House
Fuller's Tavern
Gallupville House
Glen Iris Inn
Grossinger's Catskill Resort Hotel
Hotel Broadalbin
Hotel Champlain
The Hotel Clarence
Hotel Delaware
Hotel Lafayette
Hotel Syracuse
Hotel Utica
Jacob Crouse Inn
John Van Buren Tavern
Kirkland Hotel
Kutsher's Hotel
Larzelere Tavern
LeRay Hotel
Lexington House
Lynch Hotel
Major's Inn and Gilbert Block
Marlborough Building
Mohonk Mountain House
National Hotel
Nevele Grand Hotel
The Niagara
Paul Smith's Hotel
Phoenix Building
Pontiac Hotel
Rhinecliff Hotel
Rogues' Harbor Inn
The Sagamore
Sans Souci Hotel
Seneca Niagara Casino & Hotel
Silver Bay Association Complex
Spring House, Barryville
Spring House, Pittsford
Standard House
Stoops Hotel
Thayer Hotel
Turning Stone Resort & Casino
Ulster House Hotel
Union Hotel
W. F. DeWitt Hotel
Weldon House
Wiawaka Holiday House

Westchester County

Elephant Hotel
Westchester Country Club

North Carolina

Battery Park Hotel
Brookwood Inn
Carolina Inn
Fearrington Village
Green Park Inn
Grove Park Inn
Haughton-McIver House
Highlands Inn
Hotel Charlotte
Nu-Wray Inn
Page-Walker Hotel
Sir Walter Raleigh Hotel
Soleil Center
Westin Charlotte

North Dakota

Cole Hotel
Patterson Hotel
Powers Hotel
Waldorf Hotel

Ohio

Alcazar Hotel
Antlers Hotel
Arcade Hotel
Arlington Hotel
Barr Hotel
Berwick Hotel
Biltmore Hotel
Brick Tavern House
Carew Tower
Fountain Hotel
Golden Lamb Inn
Governor's Inn
Hillcrest Hotel
Hotel Argonne
Hotel Breakers
Hotel Courtland
Howe Tavern
Marcus Curtiss Inn
Marsh Hotel
Pennsylvania House
Quaker Square
The Seneca Hotel
Shelby House

Cincinnati

Cincinnatian Hotel
Gibson House
Netherland Plaza Hotel
Palace Hotel

Cleveland

Cleveland Arcade
Guardian Bank Building
Hollenden Hotel
Marriott at Key Center
Reserve Square
Tower City Center

Oklahoma
Buffington Hotel
Price Tower

Oklahoma City
Colcord Hotel
Skirvin Hilton Hotel

Tulsa
Ambassador Hotel
Atlas Life Building
Mayo Hotel

Oregon

Arlington Hotel
Ashland Springs Hotel
Balch Hotel
Barnum Hotel
Bowman Hotel
Columbia Gorge Hotel
Corvallis Hotel
Crater Lake Lodge
Eagle Crest Resort
Eugene Hotel
Frenchglen Hotel State Heritage Site
Geiser Grand Hotel
Hot Lake Hotel
Hotel Benton
John Jacob Astor Hotel
Julian Hotel
Lane Hotel
Multnomah County Poor Farm
New Taggart Hotel
Oregon Caves Chateau
Redwoods Hotel
Rogue Elk Hotel
Smeede Hotel
Sunriver Resort
Timberline Lodge
Travelers Home
View Point Inn
Winthrow-Melhase Block
Wolf Creek Inn State Heritage Site

Portland

Pennsylvania

 Americus Hotel
 Bedford Springs Hotel
 Buchanan Hotel
 Bush House Hotel
 Central Hotel, Mount Joy
 Commercial Hotel
 Copper Beech Manor
 Dimeling Hotel
 Eagle Hotel
 Fulton House
 George F. Schlicher Hotel
 Hotel Edison
 Hotel Hershey
 Hotel Sterling
 Kennedy Mansion
 Lancaster Arts Hotel
 Limestone Inn Bed and Breakfast
 Malden Inn
 Mount Airy Casino Resort
 Mountain Springs Hotel
 New Thomson House
 Penn Alto Building
 Radisson Lackawanna Station Hotel
 Riverside Inn
 Yardley Inn

Philadelphia

 The Bellevue-Stratford Hotel
 Drake Hotel
 Liberty Place
 Loews Philadelphia Hotel
 The Warwick

Pittsburgh

 Columbia Hotel
 Drury Hotel
 Embassy Suites
 Fairmont
 Marriott
 Renaissance Hotel
 Westin Convention Center
 William Penn Hotel
 Wyndham Grand

Rhode Island

Admiral Fitzroy Inn
Greene Inn
Ocean House, Rhode Island
Providence Biltmore
Weekapaug Inn
Westin Providence

South Carolina

Chesterfield Inn
Extended Stay Hotels
Ocean Forest Hotel
Meeting Street Inn
Pleasant Inn
Rainbow Court
The Willcox

South Dakota
Brown Palace Hotel
Bullock Hotel
Calumet Hotel

Tennessee

Andrew Johnson Building
Bijou Theatre
Chilhowee Inn
Clement Railroad Hotel Museum
Courtyard Nashville Downtown
Donoho Hotel
Gaylord Opryland Resort & Convention Center
Hale House-Patterson Hotel
Hale Springs Inn
Hermitage Hotel
Maxwell House Hotel

Memphis

Hilton Memphis
Madison Hotel
Peabody Hotel

Texas

Antlers Hotel
Baker Hotel
Blackstone Hotel
El Paisano Hotel
Gaylord Texan Resort Hotel & Convention Center
Hotel Beaumont
Hotel Blessing
Hotel Galvez
Hotel Paso del Norte
Hotel Texas
Hotel Turkey
Kendall Inn
Landmark Inn State Historic Site
LaSalle Hotel
Mobberly hotel
Nueces Hotel
Plaza Hotel, El Paso
Plaza Hotel, College Station
Saint Anthony Hotel
Settles Hotel
Stagecoach Inn (Texas)
Tarpon Inn

Austin
Driskill Hotel
Four Seasons Hotel Austin
W Austin Hotel and Residences

Dallas

Adolphus Hotel
Dallas Hilton
Four Seasons Resort and Club Dallas at Las Colinas
Hilton Anatole
Hyatt Regency Dallas
The Joule Hotel
Magnolia Hotel
Omni Dallas Convention Center Hotel
Renaissance Hotel
Sheraton Dallas Hotel

Houston

Alden Houston
Club Quarters Hotel
Four Seasons Hotel Houston  	
Hilton College of Hotel and Restaurant Management
Hotel Icon
Hyatt Regency Houston  	
Kemah Boardwalk
Magnolia Hotel
Marriott Marquis Houston
Shamrock Hotel
The Post Oak

San Antonio

Fairmount Hotel
Grand Hyatt San Antonio
Gunter Hotel
Holiday Inn Express Riverwalk Area
Marriott Rivercenter
Menger Hotel
San Antonio Marriott Riverwalk

Utah

Bigelow-Ben Lomond Hotel
Border Inn
Bryce Canyon Lodge
Bryce Inn
Forster Hotel
Goulding's Trading Post
The Grand America Hotel
Hotel Roberts
Hyland Hotel
Joseph Smith Memorial Building
Knutsford Hotel
VanFleet Hotel
Zion Lodge
Zion Nature Center-Zion Inn

Vermont

The Gables Inn
Green Mountain Inn
The Pavilion
Waybury Inn
Wilburton Inn

Virginia

Colonial Hotel (Wise, Virginia)
Exchange Hotel (Gordonsville, Virginia)
The George Washington Hotel
The Homestead (Hot Springs, Virginia)
Hotel Roanoke
Kentucky Hotel
Martha Washington Inn
Old Hotel
Orkney Springs Hotel
Panorama Resort
Patrick Henry Hotel
Skyland Resort
The Tides Inn

Hampton Roads
The Chamberlin
The Monticello Hotel
Hilton Norfolk the Main
Norfolk Waterside Marriott
Westin Virginia Beach Town Center

Richmond
Exchange Hotel
Hotel Richmond
Jefferson Hotel
Murphy's Hotel

Staunton
American Hotel (Staunton, Virginia)
Valley Hotel
Virginia Hotel

Virginia Beach
Cavalier Hotel

Washington

Ansorge Hotel
Captain Whidbey Inn
Creaser Hotel
Enchanted Valley Chalet
Evergreen Hotel
George Washington Inn
Glencove Hotel
Lake Quinault Lodge
Leopold Hotel
Montgomery House Bed and Breakfast
Monticello Hotel
Olympic Club Hotel
One Lincoln Tower
Paradise Inn
Rosemary Inn
Semiahmoo Resort
Tokeland Hotel
Wilson Hotel

Seattle

Ace Hotel
Alaska Building
Arctic Building
Butler Hotel
Camlin Hotel
The Edgewater
Fairmont Olympic Hotel
Globe Building, Beebe Building and Hotel Cecil
Grand Pacific Hotel
Hyatt Regency Seattle
Nippon Kan Theatre
OK Hotel
Panama Hotel
Seattle Hotel
Sorrento Hotel
Westin Seattle

Spokane

The Davenport Hotel
Montvale Hotel
Ridpath Hotel
Hotel Lusso
Otis Hotel
Hotel Upton

Washington, D.C.

 Capital Hilton
 The Churchill Hotel
 Donovan House
 The Dupont Hotel
 Four Seasons Hotel, Washington, D.C.
 Grand Hyatt Washington
 Hay–Adams Hotel
 Henley Park Hotel
 Hilton Washington
 Hotel Monaco
 Hotel Palomar
 Hotel Rouge
 L'Enfant Plaza Hotel
 Mandarin Oriental, Washington, D.C.
 Marriott Wardman Park
 Mayflower Hotel
 The Melrose Hotel
 Park Hyatt Washington
 The Ritz-Carlton, Georgetown
 The Ritz-Carlton, Washington, D.C.
 Omni Shoreham Hotel
 St. Gregory Luxury Hotels & Suites
 Topaz Hotel
 Willard InterContinental Washington

West Virginia

Altamont Hotel
Blennerhassett Hotel
Capon Springs Resort
Daniel Boone Hotel
Elmhurst
Glen Ferris Inn
The Greenbrier
Halfway House
Hermitage Motor Inn
Inn at Fowlerstown
Kanawha Hotel
Miller's Tavern
Mountaineer Hotel
Pence Springs Hotel Historic District
Red Sulphur Springs Hotel
Rumsey Hall
Shannondale Springs
Tyree Stone Tavern
Wells Inn

Wisconsin

Astor on the Lake
Burton House
Dousman Hotel
Governor's Mansion Inn, Madison
Heartland Inn
Hilton Milwaukee City Center
Knickerbocker Hotel
Lake Lawn Resort
Omaha Hotel
The Pfister Hotel

Wyoming

Callaghan Apartments
Cambria Casino
Canyon Hotel
Flagg Ranch
Goff Creek Lodge
Irma Hotel
Jackson Lake Lodge
Lake Hotel
Libby Lodge
Log Cabin Motel
Marshall's Hotel
Old Faithful Inn
Old Faithful Lodge
Sheridan Inn
Signal Mountain Lodge
Virginian Hotel
Wort Hotel

Territories

American Samoa
Rainmaker Hotel, Pago Pago
Tradewinds Hotel, Fagatogo

Guam
Hotel Nikko Guam

Puerto Rico

U.S. Virgin Islands
Caneel Bay

See also

 Tourist attractions in the United States
 Lists of hotels – an index of hotel list articles on Wikipedia
 List of defunct hotel chains
 List of motels

References

External links
 

United States
 
Lists of tourist attractions in the United States